Nancy Amoury Combs is an American legal scholar known for her work on international criminal law. She is Ernest W. Goodrich Professor of Law and director of the Human Security Law Center and Cabell Research Professor at the William & Mary Law School.

Education 
Combs has a Bachelor of Arts degree in philosophy from the University of Portland, a Juris Doctor from the UC Berkeley School of Law, and a PhD from Leiden University.

Career 
Combs served as a law clerk for Judge Diarmuid O'Scannlain Supreme Court Justice Anthony Kennedy. She joined the faculty at the William & Mary Law School in 2004.

Combs is the author of the books Guilty Pleas in International Criminal Law: Constructing a Restorative Justice Approach (2007)
and Fact-Finding Without Facts: The Uncertain Evidentiary Foundations of International Criminal Convictions (2010).

See also 
 List of law clerks of the Supreme Court of the United States (Seat 1)

References

20th-century births
Living people
American legal scholars
UC Berkeley School of Law alumni
University of Portland alumni
Leiden University alumni
Law clerks of the Supreme Court of the United States
Year of birth missing (living people)
Place of birth missing (living people)